2005 HKFC International Soccer Sevens, officially known as The 2005 HKFC Philips Lighting International Soccer Sevens due to sponsorship reason, is the 6th staging of this competition. It was held on 27–29 May 2005.

Urawa Red Diamonds, beating PSV Eindhoven in the final, was the Cup winner of the Main Tournament. Lorenz All Stars was the Cup winner of the Masters Tournament. Sergio Escudero of Urawa Red Diamonds was awarded the Player of the tournament. Uwe Bein was the Masters Player of the Tournament.

Results

Masters Tournament
Plate
 Singapore Cricket Club won the Plate competition by beating Southampton All Stars in the final.

Cup

Main Tournament
Plate
 Bottom two teams of each group at the Group Stage entered the Plate competition. Some of the teams include Kitchee, Hong Kong Football Club, City University of Hong Kong and Yau Yee League Select. Kitchee won the Plate by beating Hong Kong Football Club by 2–0 in the final.

Cup

Notable players
 Urawa Red Diamonds: Nobuhiro Kato, Yuzo Minami, Eliézio, Takafumi Akahoshi, Shota Arai, Shunsuke Oyama, Sergio Escudero, Koki Otani, Shunsuke Tsutsumi, 萩尾勇真 
 Lorenz All Stars: Uwe Bein
 Hong Kong Football Club: Tony Sealy
 Manchester United: Chris Eagles, Tom Heaton, Fraizer Campbell, Phil Bardsley, David Fox, David Jones, Phil Marsh

References

Sevens
HKFC International Soccer Sevens